The Ultimate Table Tennis is a professional level table tennis league in India. It was launched in 2017 and contested by 6 teams. It is organized by 11Sports promoted by Niraj Bajaj and Vita Dani and held under the aegis of Table Tennis Federation of India. It is broadcast by Star Sports.

The current champions are Chennai Lions, who won the title in their debut season after defeating the defending champions Dabang Delhi TTC in the season 3 finals in 2019.

Teams

Current teams

Owners

Former teams

Tournament seasons and results 
There have been three seasons so far with three different winners. Falcons TTC and Dabang Delhi TTC have been in finals two times.

Season 2017

Tie
A tie is an encounter between two teams and  consists of nine matches. Every match consists of three games. Every game is played up to eleven points. The team, that have won the most games of a tie is the winner.

Format

Teams

Table

Schedule

Season 2018

Format

Teams

Table

Schedule

Season 2019

Format

Teams

Table

Schedule

References

External links
 

 
Table Tennis
2017 establishments in India
Sports leagues established in 2017
Sport in India
Table tennis in India
Table tennis competitions in India
Table tennis competitions